A. E. Cowley may refer to:
 Alfred Edmeads Cowley
 Arthur Ernest Cowley